Heliophanus proszynskii is a jumping spider species in the genus Heliophanus.  It was first described by Wanda Wesołowska in 2003 and is endemic to Lesotho and South Africa.

References

Spiders described in 1986
Fauna of Lesotho
Salticidae
Spiders of Africa
Spiders of South Africa
Taxa named by Wanda Wesołowska